Connor Richard John Roberts (born 23 September 1995) is a Welsh professional footballer who plays as a right-back for  club Burnley and the Wales national team. He helped his nation qualify for the FIFA World Cup in 2022 for the first time since 1958, and was included in the squad for the tournament.

Club career

Early career
Born in Neath, Roberts grew up in the nearby village of Crynant and joined Swansea City's Youth Academy at the age of 9. After progressing through the academy, Roberts won the 2014–15 Professional U21 Development League 2 title in his debut professional season and was rewarded with a new two-year contract.

Roberts signed a new three-year contract with Swansea City in September 2016. Upon returning from Bristol Rovers, Roberts linked up with Swansea City Under-23s and went on to win the 2016–17 Professional U23 Development League 2 title and 2016–17 Premier League Cup.

Loan moves
On 8 August 2015, Roberts joined League Two club Yeovil Town on a one-month loan deal, and made his debut later that day in a 3–2 defeat against Exeter City. Roberts quickly established himself at Huish Park, and the Glovers extended Roberts' loan contract to the end of the 2015–16 season. Roberts made 54 appearances for Yeovil over the course of the season, missing just one match due to a call-up to the Wales under-21 national team. Roberts received three Player of the Year Awards and was also voted Young Player of the Year.

In August 2016, Roberts joined League One club Bristol Rovers on a six-month loan deal. Roberts made his debut in a 3–2 victory over Northampton Town on 1 October 2016, and made a further four appearances for the Pirates before returning to Swansea.

On 14 July 2017, it was announced that Roberts would be joining Championship club Middlesbrough on a season-long loan deal. After making one league appearance his loan spell was terminated in January and he returned to Swansea City.

Swansea City
Roberts made his debut for Swansea City on 6 January 2018 in the FA Cup third round against Wolverhampton Wanderers. On 29 September, he scored his first goal for the club in a 3–0 win over Queens Park Rangers. On 3 June 2021, Roberts was named Swansea City Player of the Year for the 2020–21 season.

Burnley
On 31 August 2021, Roberts joined Premier League side Burnley for an undisclosed fee signing a four-year deal.

International career
Roberts has been capped at Wales under-19 level. In March 2016, Roberts received his first call-up to the Wales under-21 side for their 2017 UEFA European Under-21 Championship qualification matches, and made his debut as a second-half substitute in their 2–1 defeat against Romania, on 29 March 2016.

He was called into the Wales national football team for the first time on 15 March 2018. He made his senior international debut in the China Cup final against Uruguay in March 2018 when he came on as a 59th minute substitute for Declan John. Roberts scored his first goal for the senior team in a 4–1 victory over the Republic of Ireland on 6 September 2018, finishing a half-volley set up by Gareth Bale. In May 2021, he was selected for the Wales squad for the delayed UEFA Euro 2020 tournament. On 16 June, Roberts scored the second goal in a 2–0 win against Turkey, once again assisted by Bale. On 26 June, Roberts' participation in the tournament ended due to a groin injury sustained in the first half, and Wales went on to lose 4–0 to Denmark.

In November 2022 he was named in the Wales squad for the 2022 FIFA World Cup in Qatar.

Career statistics

Club

International
.

As of match played on 13 November 2021. Wales' score listed first, score column indicates score after each Roberts goal.

Honours
Individual
 Swansea City A.F.C. Player of the Year: 2020–21

References

External links

1995 births
Living people
Footballers from Neath
Welsh footballers
Wales youth international footballers
Wales under-21 international footballers
Wales international footballers
Association football defenders
Swansea City A.F.C. players
Yeovil Town F.C. players
Bristol Rovers F.C. players
Middlesbrough F.C. players
Burnley F.C. players
English Football League players
Premier League players
UEFA Euro 2020 players
2022 FIFA World Cup players